The Piano Sonata in B minor, Op.5, was written by Richard Strauss in 1881–82 when he was 17 years old. The Sonata is in the Romantic style of his teenage years.  The first recording of the piece was the last recording made by the Canadian pianist Glenn Gould.

Composition 

The Piano Sonata is in four movements:

 Allegro molto Appassionato
 Adagio Cantabile
 Scherzo Presto – Trio un poco piu Lento
 Finale, Allegro vivo.

The first movement and Finale are in Sonata form. The Adagio is in Ternary form with an ABA structure; the Scherzo is a "full fledged Scherzo in an expanded ABABA form . The first movement is notable for having the main theme based on the repeated note short-short-short long which echoes the rhythm of the Fate motif of Beethoven's Fifth symphony. Larry Todd states that:  The first movement appropriates its familiar four-note head motive from Beethoven's Fifth Symphony. The first movement is fairly saturated with the motive, which appears in the first theme, the bridge and the closing section of the exposition. In addition, much of the development is devoted to a treatment of the motive, and in the closing bars of the movement we find a major key version of the close of Beethoven's first movement". .    In the three subsequent movements, "the reliance on Mendelssohn comes more and more to the fore". In particular, Todd argues that Strauss' Adagio Cantabile is effectively a Mendelssohnian Lied ohne Worte (Song without words) .  In the Scherzo and Finale, one can also find echoes of Mendelssohn, both in terms of structure, time signature and thematic material.  The performance time is approximately 27 minutes.

Strauss had been writing pieces for the piano since he was seven years old, but the Piano Sonata was the most significant one of three to which he gave an opus number (the other two being his Five piano pieces, Op. 3, written in 1882, and Stimmungsbilder, Op. 9, written in 1884).

Recordings 

The best known recording of the piano Sonata was also its first recording, being the last recording by Glenn Gould. (It was recorded between September 1–3, 1982 in New York City.) The recordings of the piece include:

References

Sources

External links 
 

Strauss, Richard
Compositions by Richard Strauss
1881 compositions
Compositions in B minor